Kris Yao (born December 1951) is a Taiwanese architect, and the founder and head architect at KRIS YAO | ARTECH in Taipei and Shanghai.

Biography 
Yao was born and raised in Taipei, Taiwan. Yao received his Bachelor of Architecture at Tunghai University  in 1975, and received his Masters in Architecture at the University of California, Berkeley, in 1978.

Kris Yao | Artech 
Established by Kris Yao in 1985, KRIS YAO | ARTECH is an architectural firm composed of more than 160 professionals with offices in Taipei and Shanghai.  The firm's projects are mainly  located in the Greater China area, but are also found in the United States, Europe, and South Asia. Project categories range from corporate, residential, cultural, educational, hospital, commercial, transportation, industrial architecture design, and urban planning, etc.  The award-winning and selected works including: Lanyang Museum, China Steel Corporation Headquarters, Water-Moon Monastery, and Wuzhen Theater, etc.

Selected projects
Taiwan High Speed Rail
Hsinchu Station (Hsinchu)
Changhua Station (Changhua)
Yunlin Station (Yunlin)
 Lanyang Museum (Yilan)
 Southern Branch of the National Palace Museum (Chiayi)
 Museum of Archaeology, Tainan Branch of National Museum of Prehistory (Tainan)
 Water-Moon Monastery (Taipei City)
 Lite-On Technology Center (Taipei City)
 Shih Chien University Gymnasium and Library (Taipei City)
 China Steel Corporation Headquarters (Kaohsiung City)
 Kelti Group Headquarters (Taipei City)
 Far Eastern Mega Tower, (New Taipei City)
 Cathay Landmark, (Taipei City)
 United Daily News Office Building, (Taipei City)
 Wuzhen Theater (Zhejiang, China)

Recognition 
In 2014, Yao received an Honorary Fellowship of the American Institute of Architects (Hon. FAIA). In 2003, Yao represented Taiwan in the 8th International Architecture Exhibition at Venice Biennale of Architecture (La Biennale di Venezia), in Venice, Italy. Yao was reinvited to the same event in 2008, at the 11th International Architecture Exhibition at La Biennale di Venezia. In 2004, Yao was invited to present his project, the THSR Hsinchu Station, at the 1st International Architecture Biennale in Rotterdam, the Netherlands. In the same year, he was also invited to present his projects at the 1st International Architecture Biennale in Beijing, China. In 2005, Yao was named a recipient of the Distinguished Alumni of the College of Environmental Design at the University of California, Berkeley. In 2013, Palace Museum, Southern Branch was anticipated in The International Architecture Showcase, London Festival of Architecture 2013 – Atlas of the Unbuilt World in London, UK. In 2014, Yao was re-invited to the 14th La Biennale di Venezia–Collateral Event / Time Space Existence –The Ninth Column.

In 1997, Kris Yao was awarded the "Chinese Outstanding Architect Award". In 2007, Yao became the first practicing architect in Taiwan to receive the "Taiwan National Award for Arts and Architecture", the highest honor in cultural and art disciplines in Taiwan. Yao is also collaborating with architect Rem Koolhaas in the design of the Taipei Performing Arts Center, scheduled for completion in 2015.

Awards 
2014 8th Far Eastern Architectural Design Award - Honorable Mention & Most Popular Award - Water-Moon Monastery
2014 Honorary Fellowship of the American Institute of Architects
2013 35th Taiwan Architecture Award - Water-Moon Monastery
2013 WAF Award shortlisted – Religion - Water-Moon Monastery
2013 WAF Award shortlisted – Culture – Wuzhen Theater
2013 1ST Architizer A+ Awards: Jury Winner And Popular Choice Winner -China Steel Corporation Headquarters
2012 The Chicago Athenaeum Museum Of Architecture And Design, The European Centre of Architecture Art Design And Urban Studies:The International Architecture Award - Lanyang Museum
2012 Perspective Awards 2012 Certificate Of Excellence In Heritage Category -Langyang Museum

Monograph 
Yao's second monograph was published on April 16, 2011  by Images Publishing Group.
Yao's first monograph was published in 2001 by the Images Publishing Group Pty Ltd, in Australia.

References

External links
KRIS YAO | ARTECH official website

Taiwanese architects
Honorary Fellows of the American Institute of Architects
Artists from Taipei
1951 births
Living people